Atlanta station may refer to:

Rail stations in Atlanta 
 Peachtree station, the current Amtrak station serving Atlanta
 Terminal Station (Atlanta), demolished in 1972
 Atlanta Union Station
Atlanta Union Station (1853), burned in the Battle of Atlanta
 Atlanta Union Station (1871)
 Atlanta Union Station (1930), demolished in 1972

Other uses 
 Atlanta Station, Wisconsin